TOM1-like protein 1 is a protein that in humans is encoded by the TOM1L1 gene.

References

Further reading

External links